Bledar "Bledi" Çuçi (born 14 November 1970) is an Albanian politician. From January 2019 until December 2020 he served as Minister of Agriculture and Rural Development in the second cabinet of Edi Rama. On 16 December 2020, he was chosen by Prime Minister Edi Rama to serve as Interior Minister following the resignation of Sandër Lleshaj after mass protests hit the country following the police shooting of a 25 year old man who broke quarantine curfew.

Personal life
Cuci is married to Delina Fico, a civil society activist. In the late 90's, Fico was the fiancee of current Albanian Prime Minister Edi Rama, in whose cabinet Cuci serves.

References 

Living people
1970 births
Politicians from Tirana
21st-century Albanian politicians
Government ministers of Albania
Agriculture ministers of Albania